Jean Raymond Gottlieb (born 1967) is a former Paris gendarme in France and ski instructor and palace guard at the Palais Princier in Monaco.

He was the Head of Security to Princess Stéphanie when they became lovers but resigned as bodyguard when the romance started.  It is rumoured that he is the father of Princess Stéphanie's daughter Camille, born on 15 July 1998 at Princess Grace Hospital Centre in Monte Carlo, Monaco, who closely resembles him and holds his surname by birth. While the princess has consistently refused to name the father or to put his name on the child's birth certificate, Camille herself has acknowledged Jean Raymond as her father.

References

1967 births
Living people
House of Grimaldi
Monegasque military personnel
Bodyguards

pl:Rodzina książęca Monako - linia de Polignac#Stefania Grimaldi